Khanak is a rural locality (a selo) in Guninsky Selsoviet, Tabasaransky District, Republic of Dagestan, Russia. The population was 280 as of 2010. There are 4 streets.

Geography 
Khanak is located 20 km southwest of Khuchni (the district's administrative centre) by road. Bukhnag is the nearest rural locality.

References 

Rural localities in Tabasaransky District